Bruceina  is a genus of sea snails, marine gastropod mollusks in the family Calliostomatidae.

Species
Species within the genus Bruceina include:
 Bruceina chenoderma (Barnard, 1963)
 Bruceina cognata Marshall, 1988
 Bruceina eos Marshall, 1988
Species brought into synonymy
 Bruceina hayesi Herbert, 1995: synonym of Bruceina chenoderma (Barnard, 1963)

References

 Özdikmen H. (2013) Substitute names for three preoccupied generic names in Gastropoda. Munis Entomology & Zoology 8(1): 252-256

External links

 
Calliostomatidae
Gastropod genera